Ľubomír Švajlen (born 17 February 1964 in Košice) is a Slovak former handball player who competed in the 1992 Summer Olympics.

References

1964 births
Living people
Slovak male handball players
Olympic handball players of Czechoslovakia
Czechoslovak male handball players
Handball players at the 1992 Summer Olympics
Sportspeople from Košice